Košarkaški klub Sloga, commonly referred to as KK Sloga, is a men's professional basketball club based in Kraljevo, Serbia. The club plays in the Basketball League of Serbia and the Adriatic League. Their home arena is the Kraljevo Sports Hall. 

Some of the club's star players over the years have included Vlade Divac and Ljubodrag Simonović.

History

Sponsorship naming
Sloga has had several denominations through the years due to its sponsorship:
 Sloga Magnohrom: 1990–1991
 Sloga Telekom Srbija: 2000–2001
 Sloga Favorite BM: 2003–2004
 Sloga Société Générale: 2005–2007

Identity 
The main color of Sloga, since its foundation, is white. Because of it the Sloga players are often nicknamed Beli. Supporters of Sloga are Kasapi and they also support the football section of the Sloga Sports Society, FK Sloga Kraljevo.

Home arena

Sloga plays its home games at the Kraljevo Sports Hall. The hall is located in Kraljevo and was built in 2015. It has a seating capacity of 3,331 seats.

Players

Current roster

Hall of Famers and greatest players
Naismith Memorial Basketball Hall of Fame

FIBA Hall of Fame

FIBA's 50 Greatest Players

Coaches

 Milovan Bogojević (1990–1991)
 Gordan Marković (1991–1992)
 Rajko Toroman (1992)
 Gordan Marković (1993)
 Srboljub Đorđević (1994)
 Nenad Trajković (1995–1996)
 Dragan Kostić (2002–2003)
 Miodrag Kadija (2005–2006)
 Miloš Pejić (2006–2008)
 Dragan Kostić (2008–2009)
 Miloš Pejić (2009–2010)
 Bojan Kusmuk (2010–2011)
 Zoran Milovanović (2011–2013)
 Mihajlo Drobnjak (2013)
 Vladimir Đokić (2013–2014)
 Zoran Petrović  (2014–2016)
 Dragan Kostić (2016)
 Boško Đokić (2016–2017)
 Bojan Kusmuk (2017)
 Mihajlo Drobnjak (2017–2018)
 Zoran Petrović (2018–2019)
 Saša Pavlović (2019–2020)
 Zoran Petrović (2020–2021)
 Dragan Kostić (2021)
 Marko Dimitrijević (2021–present)

Trophies and awards

Awards 
 BLS First League MVP
  Miloš Bojović (1) – 2006–07

 BLS Super League MVP
  Miloš Bojović (1) – 2006–07

Notable players

 Vlade Divac
 Sreten Dragojlović
 Ljubodrag Simonović
 Dragan Todorić
 Miloš Babić
 Miloš Pejić
 Slobodan Božović
 Marko Dimitrijević
 Stefan Jović
 Vuk Radivojević
 Saša Vasiljević
 Saša Dončić

References

External links
 
 KK Sloga at eurobasket.com

Basketball teams in Serbia
Basketball teams in Yugoslavia
Basketball teams established in 1949
1949 establishments in Serbia
Kraljevo